Carrollton or Carrolton is a name commonly associated with places that can also serve as a given name.  People who are known by names that include Carrollton or Carrolton include the following:

Charles Carrolton "Chick" Fraser (1873 – 1940), American baseball player
Rufus Carrollton Harris (1896 – 1988), American university president
Charles Carroll of Carrollton (1737 – 1832), Irish-American politician and patriot

See also

Carrollton (disambiguation)